"Young Livers" is a song by the American alternative rock band Rocket from the Crypt, released as the second single from their 1995 album Scream, Dracula, Scream! It was released as both a 7" vinyl and CD single by Elemental Records and peaked at #67 on the UK Singles Chart. A music video for the song received play on MTV and MTV Europe.

Track listing
"Young Livers" - 2:54
"Burning Army Men" - 1:04

Personnel
Speedo (John Reis) - guitar, lead vocals
ND (Andy Stamets) - guitar, backing vocals
Petey X (Pete Reichert) - bass, backing vocals
Apollo 9 (Paul O'Beirne) - saxophone, percussion, backing vocals
JC 2000 (Jason Crane) - trumpet, percussion, backing vocals
Atom (Adam Willard) - drums
Frank Daly - backing vocals
Donnell Cameron - engineering, recording
Eddie Miller - assistant engineer
Andy Wallace - mixing of "Young Livers"
Geoff Harrington and Mike Arnold - recording and mixing of "Burning Army Men"

Chart positions

References 

1996 singles
Rocket from the Crypt songs
1995 songs